The women's 800 metre freestyle event at the 2012 Summer Olympics took place on 2–3 August at the London Aquatics Centre based at the Olympic park London.

Aged only 15, American Katie Ledecky narrowly missed the world record on the final lap to recapture the first Olympic title for the Americans since Brooke Bennett topped the podium in 2000. Strengthening her lead almost the entire race, she headed into the 750-metre turn under world-record pace, and pulled off a stunning upset from the rest of the field to post a personal best and smash Janet Evans' 23-year-old U.S. record in 8:14.63. Spain's Mireia Belmonte García added a second silver to her Olympic hardware in a national record of 8:18.76. Meanwhile, Great Britain's Rebecca Adlington, the reigning Olympic champion, tried to hold on with Ledecky earlier through the race, but faded down the stretch to pick up a bronze in 8:20.32.

New Zealand's Lauren Boyle produced a spectacular swim to finish with a fourth-place time and an Oceanian record in 8:22.72. Meanwhile, Denmark's Lotte Friis, the defending bronze medalist, opened up the race with an early lead, but dropped back to fifth in 8:23.86 to hold off a fast-charging Hungarian Boglárka Kapás (8:23.89) on the final lap by almost a fingertip. France's Coralie Balmy (8:29.26) and Venezuela's Andreina Pinto (8:29.28) rounded out the field in one of the program's long-distance pool races.

Records
Prior to this competition, the existing world and Olympic records were as follows.

Results

Heats

Final

References

External links
NBC Olympics Coverage

Women's 00800 metre freestyle
2012 in women's swimming
Women's events at the 2012 Summer Olympics